Tánclépés is a first album by Hungarian singer Zoli Ádok, released 2008. The album contains 13 songs.

Track listing
Tánclépés
Manolita
Egyszer nézett rám
Legfázósabb nyár
Kódzsungel
Van idõ
A lekled porcelán
Megy a show
Soha ne mondd, hogy vége
Velem a fény
A legpocsékabb kávé
Dance with Me
Tanclépés (Markanera remix)

References

2008 debut albums
Zoli Ádok albums